Synthon is a Dutch  multinational that produces generic human drugs.

The company was founded in 1991 by Jacques Lemmens and Huub Sanders, two organic chemists of the Radboud University Nijmegen. Synthon is active in the Netherlands, the Czech Republic, Spain, the United States, Argentina, Chile, Russia, Mexico and South Korea with about 1,500 employees. The company is headquartered in Nijmegen.

Medications made by Synthon include:
 Simvastatin (A statin)
 Tamsulosin (An alpha blocker for the symptomatic treatment of benign prostatic hyperplasia)
 Paroxetine (An antidepressant)
 Fluvoxamine (An antidepressant)

The products are marketed by partners of the company. The name Synthon is not mentioned on the packaging.

History 
In 2007 the company started developing biopharmaceuticals. 

In May 2012 Synthon announced that it bought the Biolex LEX System for manufacturing biopharmaceuticals in Lemna. The sale also included two preclinical biologics made with the LEX System, BLX-301, a humanized and glyco-optimized anti-CD20 antibody for non-Hodgkin's B-cell lymphoma and other B-cell malignancies and BLX-155, a direct-acting thrombolytic. The financial terms of the sale were not disclosed.

References

External links 
 

1991 establishments in the Netherlands
Dutch brands
Generic drug manufacturers
Life sciences industry
Pharmaceutical companies established in 1991
Pharmaceutical companies of the Netherlands
Biotechnology companies established in 2007
Companies based in Gelderland